Pansy is an unincorporated community in Jefferson County, in the U.S. state of Pennsylvania.

History
A post office was established at Pansy in 1884, and remained in operation until 1950. In 1917, Pansy was one of four post offices in Beaver Township.

References

Unincorporated communities in Jefferson County, Pennsylvania
Unincorporated communities in Pennsylvania